Longinus is the name given to the unnamed Roman soldier who pierced the side of Jesus with a lance; who in medieval and some modern Christian traditions is described as a convert to Christianity. His name first appeared in the apocryphal Gospel of Nicodemus. The lance is called in Christianity the "Holy Lance" (lancea) and the story is related in the Gospel of John during the Crucifixion. This act is said to have created the last of the Five Holy Wounds of Christ.

This person, unnamed in the Gospels, is further identified in some versions of the legend as the centurion present at the Crucifixion, who said that Jesus was the son of God, so he is considered as one of the first Christians and Roman converts. Longinus' legend grew over the years to the point that he was said to have converted to Christianity after the Crucifixion, and he is traditionally venerated as a saint in the Roman Catholic Church, Eastern Orthodox Church, and several other Christian communions.

Origins of the story
No name for this soldier is given in the canonical Gospels; the name Longinus is instead found in the apocryphal Gospel of Nicodemus. Longinus was not originally a saint in Christian tradition. An early tradition, found in a sixth or seventh century pseudepigraphal "Letter of Herod to Pilate", claims that Longinus suffered for having pierced Jesus, and that he was condemned to a cave where every night a lion came and mauled him until dawn, after which his body healed back to normal, in a pattern that would repeat until the end of time. Later traditions turned him into a Christian convert, but as Sabine Baring-Gould observed: "The name of Longinus was not known to the Greeks previous to the patriarch Germanus, in 715. It was introduced amongst the Westerns from the Apocryphal Gospel of Nicodemus. There is no reliable authority for the Acts and martyrdom of this saint."

The name is probably Latinized from the Greek lonche (λόγχη), the word used for the lance mentioned in John . It first appears lettered on an illumination of the Crucifixion beside the figure of the soldier holding a spear, written, perhaps contemporaneously, in horizontal Greek letters, LOGINOS (ΛΟΓΙΝΟϹ), in the Syriac gospel manuscript illuminated by a certain Rabulas in the year 586, in the Laurentian Library, Florence. The spear used is known as the Holy Lance, and more recently, especially in occult circles, as the "Spear of Destiny", which was revered at Jerusalem by the sixth century, although neither the centurion nor the name "Longinus" were invoked in any surviving report. As the "Lance of Longinus", the spear figures in the legends of the Holy Grail.

Blindness or other eye problems are not mentioned until after the tenth century. Petrus Comestor was one of the first to add an eyesight problem to the legend and his text can be translated as "blind", "dim-sighted" or "weak-sighted". The Golden Legend says that he saw celestial signs before conversion and that his eye problems might have been caused by illness or age. The touch of Jesus's blood cures his eye problem:

Christian legend has it that Longinus was a blind Roman centurion who thrust the spear into Christ's side at the crucifixion. Some of Jesus's blood fell upon his eyes and he was healed. Upon this miracle Longinus believed in Jesus.

The body of Longinus is said to have been lost twice, and that its second recovery was at Mantua in 1304, together with the Holy Sponge stained with Christ's blood, wherewith it was told—extending Longinus' role—that Longinus had assisted in cleansing Christ's body when it was taken down from the cross. The relic, corpules of alleged blood taken from the Holy Lance, enjoyed a revived cult in late 13th century Bologna under the combined impetus of the Grail romances, the local tradition of eucharistic miracles, the chapel consecrated to Longinus, the Holy Blood in the Benedictine monastery church of Sant'Andrea, and the patronage of the Bonacolsi.

The relics are said to have been divided and then distributed to Prague and elsewhere, with the body taken to the Basilica of Sant'Agostino in Rome. However, official guides of the Basilica do not mention the presence of any tomb associated with Saint Longinus. It is also said that the body of Longinus was found in Sardinia; Greek sources assert that he suffered martyrdom in Gabala, Cappadocia.

Present-day veneration

Longinus is venerated, generally as a martyr, in the Roman Catholic Church, the Eastern Orthodox Church, and the Armenian Apostolic Church. His feast day is kept on 16 October in the Roman Martyrology, which mentions him, without any indication of martyrdom, in the following terms: "At Jerusalem, commemoration of Saint Longinus, who is venerated as the soldier opening the side of the crucified Lord with a lance". The pre-1969 feast day in the Roman Rite is 15 March.  The Eastern Orthodox Church commemorates him on 16 October. In the Armenian Apostolic Church, his feast is commemorated on 22 October.

The statue of Saint Longinus, sculpted by Gian Lorenzo Bernini, is one of four in the niches beneath the dome of Saint Peter's Basilica, Vatican City. A spearpoint fragment said to be from the Holy Lance is also conserved in the Basilica.

Longinus and his legend are the subject of the Moriones Festival held during Holy Week on the island of Marinduque, the Philippines.

Brazil

Folkloric role
Under the folk name "São Longuinho", Saint Longinus is attributed the power of finding missing objects. The saint's aid is summoned by the chant:

Folk tradition explains the association with missing objects with a tale from the saint's days in Rome. It is said he was of short stature and, as such, had unimpeded view of the underside of tables in crowded parties. Due to this, he would find and return objects dropped on the ground by the other attendants.

Accounts vary regarding the promised offering of three hops, citing either deference to an alleged limping of the saint or a plea to the Holy Trinity.

Brazilian spiritism
Brazilian medium Chico Xavier wrote Brasil, Coração do Mundo, Pátria do Evangelho, a psychographic book of authorship attributed to the spirit of Humberto de Campos. In the book, Saint Longinus is claimed to have been reincarnated as Pedro II, the last Brazilian emperor.

In popular culture

 In Irving Pichel's 1939 film The Great Commandment, Albert Dekker portrays him as the commanding officer of a Roman army company escorting a tax collector about Judea. Subsequently, he is converted to Christianity through the kindness of Joel bar Lamech and by his own experiences at Golgotha.
 In the George Stevens's 1965 film The Greatest Story Ever Told, Longinus is identified with the centurion who professed, "Truly this man was the Son of God" on Golgotha (portrayed by John Wayne in a cameo role).
 Casca Rufio Longinus, in the Casca novel series by Barry Sadler, accidentally ingests some of Christ's blood after lancing him. He is condemned by Christ to walk the earth as a soldier until they meet again at the Second Coming. This series of novels is continued by  British writer Tony Roberts following the death of Barry Sadler.
 Cassius Longinus is the main character of Louis de Wohl's novel The Spear (1955).
 Gaius Cassius Longinus is one of the main characters in the 1997 Fox series "Roar," starring Heath Ledger.  In the series, Longinus has spent 400 years searching for the Spear of Destiny, finally arriving in Ireland.
 He is referenced in the second season of DC's Legends of Tomorrow and most of the season is about trying to find the “spear of destiny” that he used to kill Christ.
 In the historical fiction series End of the Line (2019), Gaius Cornelius Longinus acts as a near immortal caretaker for the House of David, and is called upon by the Allied Powers to assist in artifact and relic recovery during the Second World War.
 In the Vampire: The Requiem roleplaying books, Longinus is a mythical character who was cursed with vampirism when Jesus died. His story, called the Testament of Longinus, serves as the basis for a sect of modern Christian vampires called the Lancea et Sanctum.
 In the historical fiction series Britannia, during a flashback to earlier times, a young Aulus Plautius orders his second in command Perfectus to lance Jesus on the cross. Reluctantly he commits the act, reflecting the conflict Longinus may have felt considering his later conversion.
 In the Japanese anime Neon Genesis Evangelion, the Lance of Longinus is a spear found in the abdomen of the Second Angel, Lilith.
 In the Beyblade Burst series, characters Lui Shirosagi (1° Season–Turbo, Surge–QuadDrive) and Lodin Hajima (Rise) own Longinus beys, represented by a white dragon. In the dub and Hasbro releases however, the bey had its name changed to Luinor.
The James Patterson/Andrew Cross novel The Jester has the main character coming home from The Crusades in 11th century France to find his family killed and his village ravaged by a team of knights, who are looking for a priceless artifact. Unbeknownst to him, that artifact has been hidden in a staff he has brought home.
In the Japanese light novel Fate/Requiem (2018-ongoing), Lucius Longinus is the Lancer-class Servant of Chitose Manazuru who won the Holy Grail War predating the events of the novel, and appears as a supporting character.

Gallery

See also
 List of names for the Biblical nameless
 Moriones Festival
 Wandering Jew, a figure with whom he is sometimes identified

References

External links

 The Reliquary of Saint Longinus
 Catholic Forum: "St. Longinus"
 St. Longinus
 Catholic-Saints "St. Longinus"
 Longinus
 Martyr Longinus

1st-century Christian saints
1st-century deaths
1st-century Romans
Mythological blind people
Christian hagiography
Christian mythology
Christian saints from the New Testament
Legendary Romans
Military saints
People in the canonical gospels
Romans from unknown gentes
Unnamed people of the Bible
Year of birth unknown